Lottigna is a village and former municipality in the canton of Ticino, Switzerland.

It was first recorded in year 1201 as Lotingnia.

The municipality also contained the village Acquarossa. It had 105 inhabitants in 1682, and from 1850 to 1950 the population count remained stable around 130. It then dropped to 79 in both 1970 and 2000.

In 2004 the municipality was merged with the other, neighboring municipalities Castro, Corzoneso, Dongio, Largario, Leontica, Marolta, Ponto Valentino and Prugiasco to form a new and larger municipality Acquarossa, the name taken from the old village in Lottigna.

Notable people
Moisés Santiago Bertoni, Swiss naturalist

References

External links

Former municipalities of Ticino
Villages in Ticino